Ivan Khlyntsev is a Russian professional ice hockey forward  who currently plays for HC Yugra of the Kontinental Hockey League (KHL).

References

External links

Living people
HC Yugra players
Year of birth missing (living people)
Russian ice hockey forwards